March in March refers to a series of marches which were held around Australia on 15–16 March 2014, and in Canberra, the national capital, on 17 March 2014, a parliamentary sitting day. The marches were attended by at least eighty thousand people across Australia and were peaceful (The Sydney Morning Herald reported 112,000). Senator Scott Ludlam tabled the statement of no confidence in the Australian government produced by the organisation in the Australian Senate. Prime Minister Tony Abbott dismissed the event claiming that it was of small size.

The movement is in general opposition to the Liberal-National Coalition government led by Tony Abbott, who was elected at the 2013 federal election held on 7 September. It has mostly been organised on social media.

The March in March movement has since grown to address a wider range of issues including industrial relations, environmental issues, asylum seeker policy and opposition to privatisation of public assets.

References

External links
 March In March Australia
 Tens of thousands gather for March in March protest
 Thousands expected to march against govt
 Thousands take to Melbourne streets to protest against Abbott policies
 Flickr gallery of March in March rally images

Protests in Australia
Political movements in Australia
2014 in Australia
2014 protests